Craven House (also known as Fisher House) is a large office building in Barrow-in-Furness, Cumbria, England located on Michaelson Road close to the eponymous bridge. Craven House is owned by the Department of Work and Pensions through Barrow Borough Council and currently houses the town's principal Jobcentre alongside leasing office space to the headquarters of successful shipping company James Fisher & Sons - the only Barrow based company listed on the London Stock Exchange.

In 2003 the entire external fabric of the building was recladded and a further £1.7 million was spent in 2013 on refurbishing the inside of the building and installing a new roof. Craven House generates around £176,000 for Barrow Borough Council per annum, making it the largest individual commercial asset under the council's possession.

Tenants
 Agilisys
 Cumbria County Council
 James Fisher & Sons
 Jobcentre

See also
 List of tallest buildings and structures in Barrow-in-Furness

References

Buildings and structures in Barrow-in-Furness